The Boylston Building is an historic building at 2–22 Boylston Street in Boston, Massachusetts. The six-story sandstone building was designed by Carl Fehmer and built in 1887 by Woodbury & Leighton. It is an early instance in Boston of a skeleton-built commercial structure, rather than having load-bearing masonry walls. The building housed the Boylston Market, a wholesale trading exchange which had been on the site since 1810 (in a building designed by Charles Bulfinch).

It was designated as Boston Landmark in 1977 and listed on the National Register of Historic Places in 1980.

See also
 National Register of Historic Places listings in northern Boston, Massachusetts

References

External links
 City of Boston, Landmarks Commission. The Boylston Building Study Report, 1977

Commercial buildings completed in 1887
Office buildings on the National Register of Historic Places in Massachusetts
Office buildings in Boston
National Register of Historic Places in Boston
Landmarks in Chinatown, Boston